There are four classical muscles of mastication. During mastication, three muscles of mastication (musculi masticatorii) are responsible for adduction of the jaw, and one (the lateral pterygoid) helps to abduct it. All four move the jaw laterally.  Other muscles, usually associated with the hyoid, such as the mylohyoid muscle, are responsible for opening the jaw in addition to the lateral pterygoid.

Structure
The muscles are:
 The masseter (composed of the superficial and deep head)
 The temporalis (the sphenomandibularis is considered a part of the temporalis by some sources, and a distinct muscle by others)
 The medial pterygoid
 The lateral pterygoid

In humans, the mandible, or lower jaw, is connected to the temporal bone of the skull via the temporomandibular joint. This is an extremely complex joint which permits movement in all planes.  The muscles of mastication originate on the skull and insert into the mandible, thereby allowing for jaw movements during contraction.

Each of these primary muscles of mastication is paired, with each side of the mandible possessing one of the four.

Innervation
Unlike most of the other facial muscles, which are innervated by the facial nerve (or CN VII), the muscles of mastication are  innervated by the trigeminal nerve (or CN V).  More specifically, they are innervated by the mandibular branch, or V3. The Mandibular nerve is both sensory and motor.

Development
This is a testament to their shared embryological origin from the first pharyngeal arch.

The muscles of facial expression, on the other hand, derive from the second pharyngeal arch.

Function
The mandible is the only bone that moves during mastication and other activities, such as talking.

While these four muscles are the primary participants in mastication, other muscles are usually if not always helping the process, such as those of the tongue and the cheeks.

Clinical significance
 Temporomandibular joint disorder
 Bruxism

External links

 
 http://www.med.umich.edu/lrc/coursepages/m1/anatomy2010/html/nervous_system/infratemp_lecture.html

Muscles of the head and neck